Charles Lewis (January 3, 1907 – January 18, 1972) was an American Negro league shortstop in the 1920s.

A native of Fredericksburg, Virginia, Lewis played for the Lincoln Giants in 1926. In nine recorded games, he posted 11 hits in 39 plate appearances. Lewis died in Fredericksburg in 1972 at age 65.

References

External links
 and Seamheads

1907 births
1972 deaths
Lincoln Giants players
Baseball shortstops
Baseball players from Virginia
Sportspeople from Fredericksburg, Virginia
20th-century African-American sportspeople